Pyrenochaeta is a genus of fungus.

It includes the species Pyrenochaeta romeroi. Can cause a disease called eumycetoma.

Other species include:
 Pyrenochaeta lycopersici
 Pyrenochaeta terrestris

References

Pleosporales